The Basketball tournament at the 2011 All-Africa Games was held from September 6–16, 2011 at several venues.

Competition format
The teams with the four best records qualified for the knockout stage, which was a single-elimination tournament. The semifinal winners contested for the gold medal, while the losers played for the bronze medal.

Calendar

Men's competition

Women's competition

Medal summary

Medal table

Events

Final standings

References

 
Basketball at the African Games
basketball
2011 in African basketball
International basketball competitions hosted by Mozambique